Sosensky (masculine), Sosenskaya (feminine), or Sosenskoye (neuter) may refer to:
Sosensky Urban Settlement, a municipal formation which the town of Sosensky and three rural localities in Kozelsky District of Kaluga Oblast, Russia are incorporated as
Sosenskoye Settlement, an administrative and municipal division of Novomoskovsky Administrative Okrug of the federal city of Moscow, Russia
Sosensky (inhabited locality) (Sosenskaya, Sosenskoye), several inhabited localities in Russia